Dimitrios Georgalis (born 23 February 1974) is a Greek former cyclist. He competed at three Olympic Games, including Atlanta 1996, Sydney 2000, and Athens 2004.

References

1974 births
Living people
Greek male cyclists
Greek track cyclists
Olympic cyclists of Greece
Cyclists at the 1996 Summer Olympics
Cyclists at the 2000 Summer Olympics
Cyclists at the 2004 Summer Olympics
Sportspeople from Trikala
21st-century Greek people